C-Town may refer to:

C-Town, a supermarket chain
C Town, a shopping complex in Amman, Jordan